Luigi Serafini (6 June 1808 – 1 February 1894) was a Roman Catholic bishop and cardinal.

He was born in Magliano Sabina in 1808, and ordained a priest in 1853. In 1870, he was ordained Bishop of Viterbo. In 1877, he was elevated to cardinal. He resigned as bishop of Viterbo in 1880. In 1884, he was appointed Prefect of the Apostolic Signatura. The following year, he was appointed Prefect of the Sacred Congregation of the Council. He died in 1894, at the age of eighty-five.

External links
Luigi Serafini at Catholic Hierarchy 

1808 births
1894 deaths
Bishops of Viterbo
Members of the Sacred Congregation of the Council
Prefects of the Apostolic Signatura
Cardinals created by Pope Pius IX
19th-century Italian cardinals
19th-century Italian Roman Catholic bishops